Evil Dead Rise is a 2023 American supernatural horror film written and directed by Lee Cronin. It is the fifth installment of the Evil Dead film series. The film stars Lily Sullivan and Alyssa Sutherland as two estranged sisters trying to survive and save their family from demonic creatures. Morgan Davies, Gabrielle Echols, and Nell Fisher appear in supporting roles.

The film's development was preceded by scrapped plans for sequels to Evil Dead (2013) and Army of Darkness (1992), and a fourth season of Ash vs Evil Dead (2015–2018). By October 2019, Sam Raimi announced that a new film was in development, with Rob Tapert producing, Raimi and Bruce Campbell executive producing, and Cronin writing and directing the project. New Line Cinema (the first film's distributor) was announced as a production company involved. Principal photography took place in New Zealand from June to October 2021.

Evil Dead Rise had its premiere at South by Southwest on March 15, 2023, and is scheduled to be released in the United States on April 21, by Warner Bros. Pictures.

Premise 
After a long journey on the road, Beth visits her older sister Ellie, who is struggling to raise three children alone in a small Los Angeles apartment. However, their reunion is interrupted when they find a strange book hidden in the depths of Ellie's building, which unleashes flesh-possessing demons.

Cast 
 Lily Sullivan as Beth
 Alyssa Sutherland as Ellie
 Morgan Davies as Danny
 Gabrielle Echols as Bridget 
 Nell Fisher as Kassie
 Richard Crouchley as Caleb
 Mirabai Pease as Teresa 
 Anna-Maree Thomas as Jessica

Production

Development 
At the South by Southwest premiere, Fede Álvarez announced that his film Evil Dead (2013), a remake of The Evil Dead (1981), would be getting a sequel. In addition, Sam Raimi confirmed plans to write Evil Dead 4 with his brother Ivan Raimi; it was later specified that the film would be a sequel to Army of Darkness (1992). At a WonderCon panel in March 2013, Bruce Campbell and Álvarez stated that their ultimate plan was for Álvarez's Evil Dead 2 and Raimi's Army of Darkness 2 to be followed by a seventh film which would merge the narratives of Ash Williams and Mia Allen. Campbell confirmed that he would reprise his role as Ash in Army of Darkness 2. Álvarez later that month tweeted to his followers that Raimi would serve as director on Army of Darkness 2. By November, Campbell expressed doubts in a fourth Evil Dead film. In September 2017, during a panel at Fan Expo Canada, Campbell stated that he believes the only successful future for the franchise is via a premium cable network, citing Ash vs Evil Dead on Starz as an example.

In November 2018, Álvarez announced that "They're just ideas right now. Nothing to announce officially. We do have a script for Don't Breathe 2. That's the only difference. We don't have a script for Evil Dead 2. But we do have a script for Don't Breathe 2 that we wrote." He also said that "When I tweeted that I was interested in seeing what people prefer. We were having some internal debates about what people would be interested in most. Unfortunately, Evil Dead 2 won. Which, I guess I would have preferred Don't Breathe 2 to win because it's one of my own creations. Obviously Evil Dead has the bigger following." In July 2019, Raimi discussed the future of the Evil Dead franchise, saying that "We'd like to make another Evil Dead feature and in fact we're working on some ideas right now." Raimi said that he would be interested in making another film with Campbell, however, Campbell earlier claimed that he had retired from the role of Ash. He said another option would be a sequel to the 2013 reboot, however, he is unsure if Álvarez would want to make a sequel at this point because the director is a successful "artist in demand" now.

Pre-production 
In October 2019, Raimi announced at New York Comic Con that a new film was in development. Robert G. Tapert was set to produce, while Raimi and Campbell served as executive producers only, all under their Ghost House Pictures banner. In June 2020, Campbell revealed that Lee Cronin was handpicked by Raimi to write and direct the film, then titled Evil Dead Now. In May 2021, New Line Cinema (who distributed the first film) had picked up the film, with it scheduled to be released on HBO Max and retitled Evil Dead Rise.

Casting 
In May 2021, it was reported that Alyssa Sutherland and Lily Sullivan had been cast in the lead roles. In June 2021, Gabrielle Echols, Morgan Davies, and Nell Fisher were added to the cast. In July 2021, Mia Challis was reported to have joined the cast.

Filming 
Principal photography began in New Zealand on June 6, 2021, with Dave Garbett serving as cinematographer. Garbett previously served as a cinematographer on several episodes of Ash vs Evil Dead. On July 14, 2021, Cronin revealed that filming was officially half way done. Filming officially wrapped on October 27, 2021. Cronin stated the film used over 6,500 liters (about 1,717 gallons) of fake blood.

Music
In April 2022, Stephen McKeon was announced to be composing the score, after collaborating with Cronin on The Hole in the Ground (2019).

Release 
Evil Dead Rise had its world premiere at South by Southwest (SXSW) on March 15, 2023, before its theatrical release on April 21, 2023, by Warner Bros. Pictures. 

The film was originally set for a streaming-only release on HBO Max, but was switched to a theatrical release in August 2022 as part of a restructuring plan for film distribution at Warner Bros. that would see the studio relying less on HBO Max-only releases and more on theatrical releases.

Reception

Notes

References

External links 
 
 

2020s American films
2020s English-language films
2023 films
2023 horror films
American horror films
American splatter films
American supernatural horror films
Dark fantasy films
Demons in film
The Evil Dead (franchise) films
Films about spirit possession
Films set in apartment buildings
Films set in Los Angeles
Films shot in New Zealand
Ghost House Pictures films
Warner Bros. films
Works by Lee Cronin